Stories of a Stranger is the fifth studio album by American rock band O.A.R. (Of a Revolution). The album was released on October 4, 2005 by Everfine Records and Lava Records, and debuted and peaked at #40 on the Billboard 200.

Three songs from Stories of a Stranger were released as singles, "Love and Memories" in 2005 as well as "Heard the World" and "Lay Down" in 2006. "Love and Memories" was at the time their best charting single, peaking at #98 in the Pop 100, #30 in the Modern Rock Tracks chart and #18 in the Adult Top 40.

Bonus Disc
A bonus disc was packaged with this album that featured live tracks recorded at the PNC Bank Arts Center in Holmdel, NJ.  The live tracks featured "Heard the World", "Lay Down", and "About Mr. Brown".  The CD also included a never released, never performed to date, track titled "Sometimes".

Track listing

Personnel
O. A. R.
 Marc Roberge – lead vocals, guitar
 Richard On – guitar, background vocals
 Benj Gershman – bass
 Jerry DePizzo – saxophone, guitar, piano
 Chris Culos – drums

Additional musicians
 Joe Gore – electric guitar, acoustic guitar, lap steel guitar, E-bow 
 Bernie Worrell – piano, Hammond organ, Rhodes piano, synthesizer, clavinet, synth bass, Mellotron
 Colin Smith – percussion, tambourine, shaker
 Vincent Nguini – baritone saxophone
 Jerry Harrison – guitar, keyboards, celeste, percussion, drum programming, radio shortwave
 Lenny Pickett – saxophone
 Brian Switzer – trumpet
 Toby Lightman, Matt Nathanson, Cassidy, Kristen Henderson, Cathy Henderson – additional background vocals
 Raw Sun - lead & background vocals on "Program Director"

Chart positions

References

2005 albums
O.A.R. albums
Albums with cover art by Storm Thorgerson
Albums produced by Jerry Harrison